Amiya Sen may refer to:
 Amiya Sen (cricketer) (1925–2000), Indian cricketer
 Amiya Prosad Sen (born 1952), historian and religious scholar